Oshkosh North High School is a public secondary/high school located in Oshkosh, Wisconsin. Part of the Oshkosh Area School District, the school serves students in grades 9 through 12. As of 2021, there are 1,193 students enrolled at the school. It is referred to by students as "North". The facility holds an in-house TV studio, swimming pool, field house with Weight Room, and an auditorium.

The school was built in 1972 as a second high school for the city, when the Oshkosh West High School, formerly known as Oshkosh High School, facilities became too small to support the growing number for students. The school first opened as an open-concept school, with modular walls between classrooms, and multiple classes taking place in one room at the same time. After the 70s, the school began to shift toward a traditional layout, adding in permanent walls and separating many of the large classrooms.

Extracurricular activities 
Oshkosh North offers 15 unique sports. Sports offered include baseball, basketball, cross country, dance team, football, golf, gymnastics, hockey, soccer, softball, swimming and diving, tennis, track, volleyball, and wrestling, all of which participate in the Fox Valley Association. In 2000, the football team was the Division 1 state champion for the state of Wisconsin. In 2013, the Oshkosh North football team was runner-up for Division 2 champions. In 2018, the Oshkosh North basketball team were the Division 1 State Champion for the state of Wisconsin.

The school has 35 student clubs and organizations as of the 2021–2022 school year.

Notable alumni 
 Tyrese Haliburton (2018), professional basketball player for the Indiana Pacers
 Gordon Hintz (1992), Minority Leader of the Wisconsin State Assembly
 Jamie Pollard (1983), Iowa State University Athletic Director
 KennyHoopla (2014), Kenneth La'ron known by his stage name KennyHoopla is an American singer, songwriter, and rapper.

Alternative education programs 
Oshkosh North High School offers a number of alternative education programs to their students.

Communities 
Communities is an alternative education program offered via application to all students at North. The program replaces some classes with specialized ones made to provide an education that emphasizes working within a community, both within the classroom and in the city as a whole, including leadership classes, as well as alternative social studies, and English class. Collaboration, Creativity, Critical Thinking, Communication, and Commitment are the major traits that the Communities program seeks to create in its students.

eAcademy 
eAcademy is a fully online schooling option available to all K-12 students in the Oshkosh Area School District. It is also available to students who are not fully online, as individual classes they can take for courses either not offered in person, or as an alternative option that provides a more self-guided option.

References 

Public high schools in Wisconsin
Buildings and structures in Oshkosh, Wisconsin
Educational institutions established in 1972
Schools in Winnebago County, Wisconsin
1972 establishments in Wisconsin